Karl-Ivar Andersson (born 10 January 1932) is a former Swedish cyclist. He competed in the individual and team road race events at the 1956 Summer Olympics.

References

External links
 

1932 births
Living people
Swedish male cyclists
Olympic cyclists of Sweden
Cyclists at the 1956 Summer Olympics
Sportspeople from Jönköping